Presidential elections were held in the breakaway republic of Transnistria on 22 December, 1996. They were won by the incumbent Igor Smirnov, who ruled Transnistria since 1991. Smirnov's only opponent was Vladimir Malakhov, who was beaten by Smirnov, 72% to 20%.

On 2 November, it was reported that Transnistria's central electoral commission had registered only two candidates for the election. Six others, including head of the Tiraspol city council Vitalii Glebov, were unable to collect the necessary 10,000 signatures.

Before the election, Malakhov claimed that his campaign was receiving "unequal treatment" from the media. He was considering withdrawing from the race, which would invalidate the election, the constitution requiring at least 2 candidates for the election to be able to occur. However, the Parliament of Transnistria amended the constitution, so that Smirnov could get elected unopposed. Malakhov then decided to continue his campaign.

Results

|-
! style="background-color:#E9E9E9;text-align:left;vertical-align:top;" width=250|Candidate
! style="background-color:#E9E9E9;text-align:left;vertical-align:top;" width=250|Vice-pres. candidate
! style="background-color:#E9E9E9;text-align:right;" |Votes
! style="background-color:#E9E9E9;text-align:right;" |%
|-
| style="text-align: left" | Igor Smirnov
| style="text-align: left" | Alexandru Caraman
| 
| 71.94
|-
|-
| style="text-align: left" | Vladimir Malakhov
| style="text-align: left" | Vasily Protsenko
| 
| 19.84
|-
|-
|style="background-color:#f2f2f2;text-align:left;" colspan=2|None of the above, blank or invalid
|style="background-color:#f2f2f2" |
|style="background-color:#f2f2f2" |8.22
|-
| style="background-color: #f2f2f2; text-align: left; font-weight: bold" colspan=2| Total (turnout 57.1%)
| style="background-color: #f2f2f2; font-weight: bold" | 
| style="background-color: #f2f2f2; font-weight: bold" | 100.0%
|-
| style="text-align: left" colspan="5" | Sources: Olvia Press – Transnistrian press agency  Open Media Research Institute
|}

References

1996 elections in Moldova
Elections in Transnistria
1996 in Transnistria